Barbara Brown Taylor (born 1951) is an American Episcopal priest, academic, and author. In 2014, Time magazine placed her in its annual Time 100 list of most influential people in the world.

Education and recognition
Taylor was born on September 21, 1951, in Lafayette, Indiana. She did her undergraduate studies at Emory University where she graduated in 1973. She then went on to study at Yale Divinity School, where she graduated in 1976.  She was ordained in 1984, and became the rector of Grace-Calvary Episcopal Church (Episcopal Diocese of Atlanta) in Clarkesville, Georgia, in 1992. She later left parish ministry and became a full-time professor at Piedmont College in Demorest, Georgia, and an adjunct professor of Christian spirituality at Columbia Theological Seminary in Decatur, Georgia. She taught world religions and exposed her mainly Christian students to other faiths so they could better understand how various groups worship.

In 1996, she was named one of the twelve "most effective" preachers in the English-speaking world by Baylor University. She was awarded the 1998 Emory Medal by the Emory Alumni Association of Emory University for her distinguished achievement in education. In February 2009, Barbara Brown Taylor led the second annual Piedmont College religion conference in Athens, Georgia. Taylor had been the keynote speaker at the conference in previous years. In addition, Taylor gave the 2009 Annual Buechner Lecture at the Buechner Institute at King University. She has written twelve books on faith and spirituality.
In February 2010, days before Piedmont College's religion conference, Taylor ranked in the top ten most influential living preachers in a poll conducted by the Southern Baptist Convention.

Career
In the early 2000s, she chose to leave active ministry, while retaining her ordination. Her memoir of this time Leaving Church: A Memoir of Faith was the first of a trilogy of books about redefining her faith followed by An Altar in the World: A Geography of Faith and Learning to Walk in the Dark.

Private life
She lives on her farm in northern Georgia, with husband Edward Taylor.

Bibliography

Learning to Walk in the Dark. HarperOne. 2014. p. 200. .

Co-editor with David L. Bartlett, Feasting on the Word Commentary Series. Westminster John Knox Press. 2008.

References

Further reading

External links
 

1951 births
20th-century American non-fiction writers
20th-century American women writers
21st-century American non-fiction writers
21st-century American women writers
Academics from Georgia (U.S. state)
American Christian writers
American Episcopal priests
American religion academics
American women academics
American women non-fiction writers
Anglican scholars
Emory University alumni
Living people
People from Lafayette, Indiana
People from Clarkesville, Georgia
Women religious writers
Yale Divinity School alumni